Bellizzi is a town and comune in the province of Salerno in the Campania region of south-western Italy.

History
Bellizzi was a frazione of Montecorvino Rovella   until 2 January 1990, when it became a comune following a referendum held in 1988.

Geography
Bellizzi borders with the municipalities of Battipaglia, Montecorvino Pugliano, Montecorvino Rovella and Pontecagnano Faiano. It is 3 km far from Battipaglia, 5 from Macchia, 6 from Pontecagnano, 11 from Montecorvino Rovella and 20 from Salerno.

Transport
Bellizzi is crossed by the national highway SS 18 and by the A2 motorway, with nearest exits in Battipaglia and Montecorvino Pugliano. It is served by the railway station of Montecorvino and the Salerno Costa d'Amalfi Airport is 3 km far from it.

References

External links

Official website  
Protezione Civile Bellizzi 

Cities and towns in Campania